Darius the Great Is Not Okay is a young adult novel by Adib Khorram, originally published August 28, 2018, by Dial Books. The book has received various awards and has been translated into eight languages (Russian, Japanese, German, Spanish, Portuguese, French, Italian, and Dutch). Darius the Great Is Not Okay follows the personal journey of Darius Kellner, an Iranian–American teenager with clinical depression, as he makes a best friend for life, reconnects with his grandparents, and repairs his relationship with his father.

Plot 
Darius the Great Is Not Okay follows Darius Kellner, an Iranian–American teenager living in Portland, Oregon, who has clinical depression. He loves Star Trek, tea, and his little sister, Laleh. Darius struggles with bullies, a lack of friends, and his disapproving dad, Stephen Kellner.

Stephen believes that it's partially Darius's fault for being bullied, since he makes himself more of a target. He dislikes Darius's hair length. Stephen also has clinical depression. The main time they spend with each other is when both they both watch an episode of Star Trek each night.

Upon discovering his babou (Darius's mom's dad) has a brain tumor, the family decides to take a trip to the desert city of Yazd, Iran, where Darius's grandparents live. Darius has not seen his grandparents in a long time, and has only talked to them through video calls, but Darius speaks little Farsi compared to his mom and sister, so he easily gets lost in the conversations. Upon arriving, Darius instantly connects with his mamou (grandmother), but struggles to get to know his babou.

Darius meets Sohrab, the son of one of Babou's neighbors. Sohrab invites him to play football, which Darius enjoys, but while showering after the game, other boys make fun of Darius' penis, calling it "Ayatollah", and Sohrab joins in. This leads to Darius leaving and having a breakdown, but Sohrab comes to apologize later in the day. Sohrab and Darius continue to bond as they hang out and begin to play football frequently. Darius feels comfortable around Sohrab; Darius feels like he can be himself around him. They often visit a rooftop (pictured in the cover) that provides a view of the city and an isolated place to talk.

Darius becomes frustrated when Laleh begins watching Star Trek with Stephen—the only thing that Darius and Stephen had together—and started without him, because he's already seen the episodes. Darius feels that Laleh is his better replacement. Darius receives an Iranian national football team jersey as a present from Sohrab, which he loves as it makes him feel like a true Persian and feel like he fits in. His family visits multiple sights of Yazd and Iran throughout the book, including Persopolis, Tower of Silence, Jameh Mosque, and the Fire Temple of Yazd.

In a few days before Darius and his family must leave Iran, Darius decides to buy Sohrab a pair of cleats as a gift. He visits the house to find their family in grief. Sohrab lashes out at Darius before revealing his father has just died (who was previously revealed to be jailed by the Iranian government for unknown reasons). Sohrab complains that Darius is always crying but has nothing to be sad for, and tells him to leave. Darius runs to the rooftop and cries.

Darius's dad finds him. They open up emotionally to each other: Stephen tells him of how he was close to suicide when Darius was young, and went on pills to prevent it. He states, "Suicide isn't the only way you can lose someone to depression." Darius explains why he was upset about Star Trek, and how he feels that Stephen thinks Darius was disappointment to him. Stephen reassures him that he loves him. 

Sohrab apologies to Darius, saying that since he was hurting, he wanted Darius to hurt too. They end on good terms and the family leaves Iran. Back in Portland, Darius has a better relationship with his dad, has frequent video calls with Sohrab and Mamou, is feeling more confident at school, and is motivated to tryout for his school's soccer team.

Reception 
Darius the Great Is Not Okay received starred reviews from School Library Journal, Publishers Weekly, and Kirkus, as well as positive reviews from The New York Times, BookPage, Entertainment Weekly, and Booklist.

Accolades

Adaptation 
Universal purchased the rights to adapt Darius the Great Is Not Okay in a motion picture to be produced by Todd Lieberman and David Hoberman's Mandeville Films. The book will be adapted by Kevin Hamedani and Travis Betz.

References 

Novels set in Portland, Oregon
Novels set in Iran
Dial Press books
2018 children's books